Kyaw Sein was a Burmese writer , former professor of psychology and former Education minister of Myanmar.

He was the last minister of education in the Burma Socialist Programme Party's government.

Early life and education
Kyaw Sein  was born on August 21, 1932,  in Bago, Myanmar. In 1950, he passed the university entrance exam at Government High School in Bago and received the Collegiate Scholarship. 

He received a Bachelor's degree from Yangon University in 1954 and a Master's degree in psychology in 1958. In 1966, he received his Ph.D. from Columbia University in New York, USA.

He served as lecturer at the Department of Psychology, Yangon University in 1954, as Assistant Lecturer in 1957,  as Lecturer in 1967 and Professor in 1977. He also served as the Rector of Yangon University in 1983 and as the Rector of Mandalay University 1985.

Political career
Under the Government of Prime Minister Ne Win, he was appointed Minister of Education in early 1988, the last time the Burma Socialist Programme Party's government was in power. But the minister's term lasted only three months.

In the 1990 Myanmar general election, he was elected from the Thingangyun constituency in Rangoon Division on behalf of the National Unity Party (NUP) and lost.

Published books

Youth Guide 1992
Applied psychology for your life() 1976
Modern Psychology (University Book Publishing Committee for the Second Year) 1969

Death
At the age of 81, he died on January 2, 2013, at 11:22 am in Yangon.

References

Government ministers of Myanmar
1932 births
2013 deaths